Manuel Sanders (born 3 April 1998) is a German athlete. He competed in the mixed 4 × 400 metres relay event at the 2019 World Athletics Championships.

References

External links

1998 births
Living people
German male sprinters
Place of birth missing (living people)
World Athletics Championships athletes for Germany
Athletes (track and field) at the 2020 Summer Olympics
Olympic athletes of Germany